PGS can stand for:

Companies
Petroleum Geo-Services, an oilfield service company
PGS Entertainment
Plant Genetic Systems, a biotech company located in Belgium

General
 Participatory Guarantee Systems, for quality assurance
 Physicians for Global Survival, a Canadian NGO
 Pre-implantation genetic screening
 Prompt Global Strike
 Pittsburgh Geological Society
 Protected Geographical Status, EU protection of regional food names
 Alliance of Primorje-Gorski Kotar (Croatian: Primorsko goranski savez), a Croatian political party
 Polygenic score, estimated effect of genetic variants
 Presentation Graphic Stream, a subtitle format used on Blu-ray discs

Schools
 Pate's Grammar School, England
 Parkstone Grammar School, England
 Penistone Grammar School, England
 Poole Grammar School, England
 Portsmouth Grammar School, England